Alexios Mosele, or Musele/Mousele (Greek: Μουσηλέ), was a Byzantine admiral (droungarios tou ploimou) in the early reign of Emperor Romanos I Lekapenos (r. 920–944). He was killed in 921, leading a detachment of imperial marines along with the imperial tagmata under the domestikos ton scholon, Pothos Argyros, against the forces of the Bulgarian tsar, Simeon I (r. 893–927) during the Byzantine–Bulgarian war of 913–927. The Byzantines were defeated at the Battle of Pegae, and during the subsequent flight, Mosele slipped and drowned while trying to board one of his warships.

References

Sources

 

10th-century Byzantine military personnel
Byzantine admirals
Byzantine people of the Byzantine–Bulgarian Wars
9th-century births
Year of birth unknown
921 deaths
Deaths by drowning